Preah Buddha Rangsey Temple, also spelled Phra Buddha Ransi Temple, is a Cambodian Theravada Buddhist temple located in Philadelphia, Pennsylvania.
In 2004, the Khmer Buddhist Humanitarian Association relocated the temple to the dilapidated St. Andrew's Lutheran Church, which was built in 1903. The temple also managed to acquire a vacant synagogue across the street, that serves as a crematory.

There is also a second location in Voorhees Township, New Jersey. It was founded by the Khmer Buddhist Humanitarian Association and the monks of the first location in Philadelphia they formerly resided in.

External links
 Website (in Khmer)

References

Asian-American culture in Pennsylvania
Cambodian-American culture
Overseas Cambodian Buddhist temples
Buddhist temples in Pennsylvania